George Smith (foaled April 30, 1913) was an American Thoroughbred racehorse and was the winner of the 1916 Kentucky Derby.

Background
George Smith was a black colt by the imported British stallion Out of Reach and out of the imported British mare Consuelo II. His grandsire, Persimmon, was a son of the great English racer and sire St. Simon.

George Smith was named after noted turfman George E. Smith, also known as "Pittsburg Phill", who was once an owner of the colt's dam. The horse was bred by Fred Forsythe and Jack Chinn and was foaled at their Fountain Bleu Farm in Harrodsburg, Kentucky. George Smith was purchased as a yearling for $1,600 by Ed Mcbride, who trained him as a yearling and raced him as a two-year-old.

Racing career
George Smith was a promising two-year-old, winning many major stakes races, including the Victoria Stakes at Old Woodbine Race Course in Toronto. He was then bought by noted Eastern horseman John Sanford for $22,500 as a two-year-old.

The 1916 Kentucky Derby was run on a clear day with a field of 9 horses. George Smith was ridden by American Racing Hall of Fame jockey Johnny Loftus and was the clear contender of the race from the start. The only competition for the win came from Star Hawk, who lost the race by a neck after a rally in the home stretch.[1}

In 1918, George Smith won the Bowie Handicap at Pimlico Race Course by defeating two other Kentucky Derby winners. The 1917 winner, Omar Khayyam, finished second, and  the 1918 winner, Exterminator, ran third. In addition, the 1918 Preakness Stakes winner War Cloud finished twelfth.

Stud career
George Smith was retired from racing at age five and stood at stud at Sanford's Hurricana Stock Farm near Amsterdam, New York. He was a disappointing sire, producing few notable offspring. On August 5, 1926, Sanford donated George Smith and another stallion called Nassovian to the Breeding Bureau of The Jockey Club. By the following year, George Smith was in the possession of the U.S. Army Remount Service, where he sired military horses for his remaining years. For the majority of his remount service, he was stationed at the Lookover Stallion Station in Avon, New York.

Pedigree

References

1913 racehorse births
Racehorses trained in the United States
Kentucky Derby winners
Racehorses bred in Kentucky
Thoroughbred family 10-d